= University of Iowa Campus Recreation and Wellness Center =

The University of Iowa Campus Recreation and Wellness Center opened in 2010 in Iowa City, Iowa, United States. The $69.2 million complex is home to the school's men's and women's swimming and diving teams.

In addition to the pools for the swimming and diving teams, the complex houses a variety of fitness areas and equipment available to the students and the public. Amenities include a running track, indoor recreational pool, rock climbing wall, and basketball gyms. The 4,100 sq ft recreational pool includes zero-depth entry, underwater beaches, vortex, bubble benches, climbing wall and current channel.

The Center is located on Madison and Burlington streets in Iowa City, Iowa.

The Center was ranked third on Best College Reviews list of The 25 Most Amazing Campus Student Recreation Centers.
